Luo Xiaojuan (骆晓娟, Luò Xiǎojuān, born 12 June 1984) is a Chinese épée fencer.

Luo won the gold medal in the épée team event at the 2006 World Fencing Championships after beating France in the final. She accomplished this with her teammates Li Na, Zhang Li and Zhong Weiping.

She also won gold medal in the women's team épée event at the 2012 Summer Olympics with Xu Anqi, Li Na (fencer) and Sun Yujie.

Achievements
 2006 World Fencing Championships, team épée

References

1984 births
Living people
Chinese female fencers
Fencers at the 2012 Summer Olympics
Olympic fencers of China
Olympic gold medalists for China
Olympic medalists in fencing
Fencers from Jiangsu
People from Yancheng
Medalists at the 2012 Summer Olympics
Asian Games medalists in fencing
Fencers at the 2006 Asian Games
Fencers at the 2010 Asian Games
Asian Games gold medalists for China
Asian Games silver medalists for China
Medalists at the 2006 Asian Games
Medalists at the 2010 Asian Games
Universiade medalists in fencing
Nanjing Sport Institute alumni
Universiade bronze medalists for China
Medalists at the 2003 Summer Universiade
21st-century Chinese women